Arthur Reynolds Irvine (17 February 1926 – 10 February 2006) was an Australian rules footballer who played for the Geelong Football Club in the Victorian Football League (VFL).

Notes

External links 

1926 births
2006 deaths
Australian rules footballers from Victoria (Australia)
Geelong Football Club players
Mooroopna Football Club players